The 2013 Open de Suède Vårgårda – team time trial will be the 6th team time trial running on the Open de Suède Vårgårda and the 6th race of the 2013 UCI Women's Road World Cup season.

Preview
Only two teams have ever won a World Cup team time trial. After the introduction of the team time trial for trade teams at the UCI Road World Championships in 2012, this team time trial World Cup race is an important benchmark for the team time trial at the 2013 UCI Road World Championships. 
, that won both the team time trial at the 2012 World Championships and the 2012 Vårgårda World Cup, is the main favourite for the victory.

The Route
The course is a 42.5 km from Vårgårda to Herrljunga and back in and is mainly flat with one small climb after 35 km of an ascent of 40 metres in 2 km. The route is a challenging course including several tight corners and narrow roads. Crosswinds could be an important factor between Vårgårda and Herrljunga and on the bridge on Kullingsleden after 32.5 km.

Race
A maximum of 25 UCI Women's Teams and National Teams between 4 and 6 riders are allowed to start. Starting order of the teams will be the reverse order from UCI Road women World Cup standing after the previous World Cup race, the 2013 Tour of Chongming Island World Cup. The first team will start at 17:30 and the next teams with 3 minutes intervals. The final time will be the time of the fourth rider crossing the finish line.

Results (top 10)

Source

Points standings

Individuals
World Cup individual standings after 6 of 8 races.

Source

Teams
World Cup Team standings after 6 of 8 races.

Source

References

External links
 

Open de Suède Vårgårda
2013 UCI Women's Road World Cup
2013 in women's road cycling
2013 in Swedish sport